Upminster was a constituency of the House of Commons in east London, which returned one Member of Parliament (MP) to the House of Commons of the Parliament of the United Kingdom, elected by the first-past-the-post voting system. It was created for the 1974 general election, and abolished for the 2010 general election.

History 
This usually safe Conservative seat was won by Labour in the landslide of 1997. It became one of the few seats that Labour lost in the 2001 general election.

Boundaries
1974–1983: The London Borough of Havering wards of Cranham, Emerson Park, Gooshays, Harold Wood, Heaton, Hilldene, and Upminster.

1983–1997: The London Borough of Havering wards of Ardleigh Green, Cranham East, Cranham West, Emerson Park, Gooshays, Harold Wood, Heaton, Hilldene, and Upminster.

1997–2010: The London Borough of Havering wards of Cranham East, Cranham West, Emerson Park, Gooshays, Harold Wood, Heaton, Hilldene, and Upminster.

Upminster was the easternmost constituency of the London Borough of Havering, and of Greater London. The constituency was oddly shaped and covered both the wealthiest and the poorest parts of the borough while being London's least ethnically diverse constituency.

The constituency included the Upminster suburb of Cranham. The boundary to the north extended beyond the A127 and A12 to include Harold Wood and Harold Hill. In the east the constituency was uniquely the only London constituency to form a protrusion to cross the M25 motorway and include North Ockendon. To the west the boundary also formed a protrusion to include the wealthy suburban area of Emerson Park which otherwise formed part of Hornchurch. The River Ingrebourne formed part of the constituency boundary to the west and the M25 Motorway formed much of the boundary to the east.

The constituency was replaced by the new Hornchurch and Upminster constituency for the 2010 general election.

Members of Parliament

Elections

Elections in the 1970s

Elections in the 1980s

Elections in the 1990s

Elections in the 2000s

See also 
 List of parliamentary constituencies in London

Notes and references

External links
 Constituency map

Politics of the London Borough of Havering
Parliamentary constituencies in London (historic)
Constituencies of the Parliament of the United Kingdom established in 1974
Constituencies of the Parliament of the United Kingdom disestablished in 2010